During Joseph Stalin's rule (1922–1953), many places, mostly cities, in the Soviet Union and other communist countries were named or renamed in honour of him as part of the cult of personality surrounding him. Most of these places had their names changed back to the original ones shortly after the 20th Congress of the Communist Party of the Soviet Union in 1956, or after the beginning of de-Stalinization in 1961.

In some countries, including those in the West, there are streets, squares, etc. named after Stalingrad (and hence indirectly after Stalin), in honour of the courage shown by the defenders at the battle of Stalingrad against Nazi Germany. These names have not been changed back, since they refer to the battle of Stalingrad rather than the city itself.

Cities

Eastern Europe

Albania 
 Qyteti Stalin, 1950–1990 – Kuçovë

Bulgaria 
 Stalin, 1949–1956 – Varna

East Germany 
 Stalinstadt, 1953–1961 – Eisenhüttenstadt

Hungary 
 Sztálinváros, 1951–1961 – Dunaújváros

Poland 
 Stalinogród, 1953–1956 – Katowice

Romania 
 Orașul Stalin, 1950–1960 – Brașov
 Stalin Region, 1950–1960 – Brașov County

Former Soviet Union

Armenia 
 Imeni Stalina, – Aygevan

Azerbaijan 
 Stalino, – Çaylı, Tartar
 Stalino, – Stalino, Goygol

Georgia 
 Staliniri, 1934–1961 – Tskhinvali, South Ossetia
 Stalinisi, 1931–1934 – Khashuri, Shida Kartli

Russia 
 Stalingrad, 1925–1961 – Volgograd
 Stalinogorsk, 1934–1961 – Novomoskovsk
 Stalinsk, 1932–1961 – Novokuznetsk

Tajikistan 
 Stalinabad, 1929–1961 – Dushanbe

Turkmenistan
 Stalin District, 1935–1961 - Murgap District

Ukraine 
 Stalino, 1924–1961 – Donetsk

Parks and natural places

Former Soviet Union

Azerbaijan 
Stalin raion, – Sabail raion

Russia 
Zavod imeni Stalina (ZIS, Factory named after Stalin) in Moscow, USSR, 1931–1959. Luxury car and truck factory. Now Zavod Imeni Likhacheva (ZIL).

Tajikistan 
Pik Stalina (Stalin Peak), 1932–1962 – Ismail Samani Peak

Eastern Europe

Bulgaria 
Vrah Stalin (Stalin Peak), 1950–1962 – Musala

Czech Republic 
Stalingrad – Housing estate Karviná-Nové Město, Karviná, 
Stalingrad – Housing estate built in 1950s Žďár nad Sázavou, The name Stalingrad is still in use in this town as of 2009 despite some attempts to rename the borough after the Velvet revolution.

Czechoslovakia 
Stalinovy závody (Stalin factories) in Záluží near Most (former german city of Brüx in the Sudetenland), 1946–1962. Chemical factory founded under the name Sudetenländische Treibstoffwerk AG in Maltheuern (now Záluží) in World War II as part of the Hermann-Göring Conglomerate (named after Nazi leader Hermann Göring) to produce synthetic oil.

Romania 
Raionul Stalin (Stalin city district), Bucharest, 
Regiunea Stalin (Stalin region), in central Romania (1950–1960)
Poiana Stalin, Poiana Braşov (1950–1960)

Slovakia 
Stalinov štít (in Slovak, Stalinův štít or štít J. V. Stalina in Czech, Stalin Peak or J. V. Stalin Peak), 1949–1961 – Gerlachov Peak,

Asia

China 
Stalin Park – Park Harbin

North America

Canada 
Geographic Township of Stalin, before 1986 – Geographic Township of Hansen, Ontario
Mount Stalin, before 1987 – Mount Peck, British Columbia

Streets and squares

Former Warsaw Pact

Czech Republic

Stalinova ulice (Stalin Street) – now Vinohradská tř. (from 1962; formerly: Říčanská, Černokostelecká, Jungmannova (1884–1920), Fochova (1920–1940), Schwerinova (1940–1945)), Prague
Stalinova ulice – now Starochodovská ul., Prague
Stalinova ulice – now Pěkná ul. (1962–1972 Jiráskova ul.), Brno-Chrlice
Stalinova ulice – now Americká ul. (Stodolní, Jungmannova, Moskevská, Vítězná), Plzeň
Stalinova třída / třída Generalissima Stalina (Stalin Road / Generalissimus Stalin Road) – now Revoluční ul. (formerly Hauptstraße), Krnov,
Stalinova třída – now třída Míru, Pardubice
Stalinovo náměstí (Stalin Square) – now Palackého nám., Bruntál
Stalinovo náměstí – now Masarykovo nám., Ostrava
Stalinovo náměstí – now Mariánské nám., Uherský Brod
Stalinovy sady (Stalin Park) – now Koliště, Brno-město

East Germany

Stalinallee (Stalin Avenue) in Berlin, East Germany, 1952–1961 – now Karl-Marx-Allee (see also: Stalin-Allee, about a film featuring this street)
Stalinstraße (Stalin Street) – now Lübsche Straße, Wismar
Stalinstraße  – now St.Annen-Straße, Brandenburg an der Havel
Stalinstraße – now Wismarsche Straße, Schwerin
Stalinstraße – now Gartenstraße, Bützow
Stalinstraße – now Am Planetarium, Jena
Stalinstraße – now Chemnitzer Straße, Mölkau
Stalinstraße – now Eisenberger Straße, Hermsdorf
Stalinstraße – now Straße des Friedens, Wurzen
Stalinstraße – now Thomasstraße, Greiz
Stalinstraße – now Schweriner Straße, Ludwigslust
Stalinstraße – now Bernhardstraße, Sonneberg
 Stalinstraße – now Fritz-Hesse-Straße, Dessau

Hungary
Sztálin út (Stalin Street) – now Andrássy út, Budapest

Poland

Ulica Józefa Stalina (Joseph Stalin Street) – now ulica Dworcowa, Gliwice
Ulica Józefa Stalina – now ulica Główna, Łódź
Ulica Józefa Stalina – now ulica Lwowska, Tarnów
Aleja Stalina (Stalin Avenue) – now Aleje Ujazdowskie, Warsaw
Ulica Marszałka Stalina (Marshal Stalin Street) – now ulica Jedności Narodowej, Wrocław
Ulica Józefa Stalina – now ulica Lipowa, Białystok
Aleja Stalina (Stalin Avenue) – now Aleja 23 stycznia, Grudziadz

Romania

Bulevardul I.V. Stalin (J.V. Stalin Boulevard) – now Bulevardul Aviatorilor, Bucharest
Piața I.V. Stalin (J.V. Stalin Square) – now Charles de Gaulle Square, Bucharest
Parcul I.V. Stalin (J.V. Stalin Park) – now Herăstrău Park, Bucharest

Slovakia

Námestie J.V. Stalina / Nám. maršála J.V. Stalina / Stalinovo námestie (J.V. Stalin Square / Marshal J.V. Stalin Square / Stalin Square) – now Námestie Maratónu mieru, Košice
Stalinova ulica (Stalin Street) – now Hlavná ulica, Prešov
Stalinovo námestie (Stalin Square) – now Námestie SNP, Bratislava

Former Soviet Union

Belarus
Prospekt imeni Stalina (Проспект имени Сталина, Stalin Avenue), 1952–1961 – now Prospekt Nezavisimosti (Проспект Независимости, Independence Avenue), Minsk

Estonia
Stalingradi väljak (Stalingrad Square) – now Tornide väljak (Towers' Square), Tallinn
Stalini tänav (Stalin Street) – now Lossi tänav (Castle Street), Kuressaare
Stalini tänav – now Vestervalli tänav (Vestervalli Street), Narva
Stalini väljak (Stalin Square) (1940–1960) – now Viru väljak (Viru Square), Tallinn
Stalini väljak – now Kesklinna park (City Park), Võru

Georgia
 სტალინის ქუჩა, (Улица Сталина, Stalin Street), Gori (Stalin's birthplace)
 სტალინის ქუჩა, (Улица Сталина, Stalin Street), Tsnori

Latvia
Staļina iela (Stalin Street), 1940–1941 – now Lielā iela (Main Street), Jelgava

Russia
 Ulitsa Stalina, (Улица Сталина, Stalin Street) – formerly Friendship Street, Beslan
 Prospekt Stalina, (Проспект Сталина, Stalin Avenue) – now Ulitsa 50 Let Pobedy

Western Europe

Austria
Stalinplatz (Stalin Square), 1946–1956 – Schwarzenbergplatz, Vienna

France
Rue Staline (Stalin Street), Essômes-sur-Marne
Boulevard de Stalingrad, Issoudun

In Paris,  Rue de Stalingrad.

Italy
Via Stalin (Stalin Street), Campobello di Licata
Via Stalin, Raffadali

Netherlands
Stalinlaan – now Vrijheidslaan, Amsterdam. Following the liberation of the Netherlands from Nazi occupation in 1945, the city of Amsterdam named three major streets for the World War II Big Three – Churchill, Roosevelt and Stalin – the three streets converging on Victory Square. The first two names remain, but the name of Stalin Street was changed to "Freedom" (Vrijheid) after the Soviet invasion of Hungary in 1956.

United Kingdom
Stalin Road, Colchester
Stalin Avenue, Chatham

North America

Trinidad and Tobago
Stalin Street, Dow Village

Asia

China

Stalin Street (斯大林大街), Changchun, (1946–1996) The longest street in Northeast China. It was given this name in the aftermath of Operation August Storm, the victorious large-scale Soviet campaign in Manchuria.
Stalin Square (斯大林广场), Dalian, (1946–1993) This square was given its name for its Stalin statue, which has since been removed.
Stalin Road, (斯大林路), Dalian
Stalin Park, (斯大林街), Harbin

Iran
Stalin Street, former name of a street in Tehran.  The city named three streets after the three leaders – Churchill, Roosevelt and Stalin – that met at the Tehran Conference of 1943.  The names all disappeared after the 1979 Islamic Revolution.

North Korea
Ssŭttallin kŏri (쓰딸린 거리; Stalin Street) – now Victory Street, Pyongyang

See also
 List of places named after Lenin
 List of renamed cities and towns in Russia
 List of things named after Fidel Castro
 List of things named after Kim Il-sung
 List of places named after Tito

References

 
Lists of places named after people
Lists of things named after politicians
Soviet Union-related lists
City name changes